William Osler Health System, formerly William Osler Health Centre, is a hospital network in Ontario, Canada that serves the city of Brampton and the northern portion of the western Toronto district of Etobicoke. The network is named for Canadian physician William Osler, one of the four founding professors of Johns Hopkins Hospital and developer of the concept of medical residency.

It has an annual operating budget of nearly $500 million CAD.

Hospitals and centres
The network consists of two hospitals and one ambulatory care centre:
Brampton Civic Hospital (established 2007) – a 608-bed hospital in northeast Brampton.
Etobicoke General Hospital (established 1972) – a 262-bed hospital located in Etobicoke, Toronto
Peel Memorial Centre for Integrated Health and Wellness (established 2017) - an ambulatory and urgent care centre in central Brampton

Former hospitals
Georgetown Hospital was previously part of the William Osler Health Centre, but in 2005 it was transferred to Halton Healthcare. Peel Memorial Hospital ceased operation in 2007 and was later superseded by the Peel Memorial Centre.

Executives
Ken White, former Trillium CEO, was appointed "Supervisor", which encompasses the role of both president and CEO as well as chairman of the board, by the Ministry of Health and Long-Term Care in 2007 "…to restore public confidence in the health centre". His term ended in April 2010 when Matthew Anderson became CEO.

Foundation 
The William Osler Health System raises funds through the William Osler Health System Foundation. Donors to the foundation include AbbVie, Algoma University, Bell, CIBC, Mercedes-Benz, Omni Television, Pfizer, Prime Asia Television, and Toronto Metropolitan University.

In April 2022, the foundation received a $128,000 donation from Amazon to assist with recovery from the COVID-19 pandemic.

References

External links
 Official website

Medical and health organizations based in Ontario
Hospital networks in Canada
William Osler